Beehive Science and Technology Academy (BSTA), is a college preparatory charter school located in Sandy, Utah.  Open to all students grades K-12, Beehive's focus is math, science and technology. Beehive supports creative development through their art programs.

History
BSTA opened August 29, 2005 in Sugarhouse. In 2008 the school moved to its Murray campus, which was used until the beginning of the 2010–2011 school year. Beehive then moved to Sandy off of 9400 South and 700 E. Beehive has since moved to 2165 E 9400 S Sandy UT. It bought a building and remodeled it to house K-12.

Organization
An eight-member school board governs BSTA. Board members are business leaders and active members of the community who bring experience in law, technology, finance, architecture and real estate.

The parents of BSTA students chaperone at dances, provide parties and fundraisers, communicate calendar items, volunteer, and other tasks. Parents and community members are encouraged to attend the school community council meetings to support and contribute to the better functioning of the school land trust program.

Learning environment
Beehive has a student–teacher ratio of 1:25. Students are placed in classes based on their math skills. Their skills in math and other core subjects are monitored throughout the year with research-based adaptive testing. Tutoring is offered by teachers weekly after school. Field tri]s provide additional learning and socializing skills. Each year local, expedition, and out-of-state college trips are offered to students. Each spring, students have the opportunity to go to Europe with faculty and parents.

Clubs meet weekly in the following areas: AMSP (Advanced Math & Science Program), FIRST Robotics Competition, FIRST Tech Challenge, FIRST LEGO League, chess, National Honor/Junior Honor Society, structural engineering, anatomy and dissection club, Mathcounts, world cultures, glee club, jewelry club, yearbook, and more. Some of the clubs' achievements are: third place FTC Robotics team 2010–2011, 23rd place FIRST Lego League 2010–2011, third place at the FIRST Lego League FIRST Championship, Utah FIRST Lego League State Champions (twice), 18 individual awards/scholarships 2009-2010 Regional Science Fair, 2008-2009 Salt Lake Valley Champion Spelling Bee, and third place in regional 2010-2011 Math Counts.

References

External links
 https://web.archive.org/web/20120401025552/http://www.beehiveacademy.org/v2/
 http://www.greatschools.org/utah/salt-lake-city/1125-Beehive-Science--Technology-Academy-BSTA/

Educational institutions established in 2005
Charter schools in Utah
Public high schools in Utah
Middle schools in Utah
Schools in Salt Lake County, Utah
Buildings and structures in Sandy, Utah
2005 establishments in Utah